Gosforth East may refer to:

 East Gosforth
 Gosforth East Middle School, a middle school in Gosforth, Newcastle upon Tyne, England